Richard Carleton (1875–1939) was an American tennis player. He excelled at tennis while at Harvard and played tennis at the Crescent Athletic Club. Carleton lost his first match at the U.S. Championships in 1896 to Edwin Fischer. In 1898 he lost in round two to Harold Hackett. Carleton reached the semi-finals of the U.S. Championships in 1903, and in beating Malcolm Whitman's younger brother was "steady and sure in the placing of his strokes." Carleton lost his semifinal to Laurence Doherty.

References

1875 births
19th-century male tennis players
1939 deaths
American male tennis players
Harvard Crimson men's tennis players
Tennis people from Illinois